The United States has had diplomatic relations with the nation of Germany and its principal predecessor nation, the Kingdom of Prussia, since 1835. These relations were broken twice (1917 to 1921, and 1941 to 1955) while Germany and the United States were at war and for a continuation interval afterwards. 

Prior to 1835, the United States and Prussia recognized one another but did not exchange representatives, except for a brief period when John Quincy Adams was accredited to the Prussian court from 1797 to 1801.

President Joe Biden nominated then University of Pennsylvania president and political philosopher Amy Gutmann for the position on July 2, 2021; by a vote of 54-42, she was confirmed by the Senate on February 8, 2022. She presented her credentials to the German President Frank-Walter Steinmeier on February 17, 2022.

List of United States ambassadors to Germany
This is a list of the chief U.S. diplomatic agents to Prussia, Germany, and West Germany (the Federal Republic of Germany), their diplomatic rank, and the effective start and end of their service in Germany.

Heads of the U.S. Legation at Berlin (1797–1801)

Heads of the U.S. Legation at Berlin (1835–1848)

Heads of the U.S. Legation at Frankfurt (1848–1849)

Heads of the U.S. Legation at Berlin (1849–1893)

Heads of the U.S. Embassy at Berlin (1893–1917)

Heads of the U.S. Embassy at Berlin (1921–1941)

Heads of the U.S. Embassy at Bonn (1955–1999)

Heads of the U.S. Embassy at Berlin (1999–present)

See also
 List of ambassadors of the United States to East Germany
 Embassy of Germany, Washington, D.C.
 Embassy of the United States, Berlin
 Germany–United States relations
 Foreign relations of Germany
 Ambassadors of the United States

References

United States Department of State: Background notes on Germany

External links
 United States Department of State: Chiefs of Mission for Germany
 United States Department of State: Germany
 United States Embassy in Berlin

Germany
 
Lists of ambassadors to Germany